is a former Japanese football player and manager.

Playing career
Hiraoka was born in Shizuoka Prefecture on September 2, 1969. After graduating from Juntendo University, he joined new club Shimizu S-Pulse based in his local in 1992. He became a regular player as left side back and the club won the 2nd place 1992 and 1993 J.League Cup. However he did not play in many matches in 1994. In 1996, he moved to the Japan Football League (JFL) club Consadole Sapporo. However he did not play in many matches there, either. In 1997, he moved to the Regional Leagues club Albirex Niigata. The club was promoted to JFL in 1998. He retired at the end of the 1998 season.

Coaching career
After retirement, Hiraoka started coaching career for Albirex Niigata in 1999. In 2007, he became a manager for Albirex Niigata Singapore and managed the club until 2008.

Club statistics

References

External links

geocities.co.jp

1969 births
Living people
Juntendo University alumni
Association football people from Shizuoka Prefecture
Japanese footballers
J1 League players
Japan Football League (1992–1998) players
Shimizu S-Pulse players
Hokkaido Consadole Sapporo players
Albirex Niigata players
Japanese football managers
Singapore Premier League head coaches
Association football defenders
Albirex Niigata Singapore FC managers
J1 League managers
Shimizu S-Pulse managers